Yen Teh-fa (born 14 November 1952) is a Taiwanese politician and retired general of the Republic of China Army. His ancestral home was in Nanjing. He was previously the Minister of National Defense and the secretary-general of the National Security Council. He was the chief of the general staff of the Republic of China Armed Forces from 30 January 2015 until 1 December 2016. He was the vice minister for armaments of the National Defense Ministry (MND) from 9 August 2013 until 15 January 2014.

Education
Yen graduated from the Republic of China Military Academy in 1975 and later attended the War College of the National Defense University.

Military career

In August 2009, Yen joined the disaster relief efforts under the 8th Army Corps following the Typhoon Morakot.

In August 2013, Yen was named the vice minister of defense for armaments. He left the post in January 2014, and was appointed the chief of the general staff of the Republic of China Armed Forces. Yen retired in December 2016, and was succeeded by Chiu Kuo-cheng. In May 2017, Yen returned to public service as secretary-general of the National Security Council. In February 2018, he was named minister of national defense in place of Feng Shih-kuan. His term was extended in February 2020 due to the ROCAF UH-60M crash with high-rank officers including Chief of the General Staff, General Shen Yi-ming, deceased. In February 2021, Yen was named a consultant to the National Security Council. He formally joined the NSC on 23 February 2021.

Legacy
On 6 January 2018, Yen criticized the PRC's unilateral decision to activate the north-bound airline of M503 Flight Route as unilaterally changing the status quo across the Taiwan Strait and severely impacting the peace and stability in the East Asian region.

Yen became the first Chief of the General Staff receiving a demerit in the ROC Armed Forces history.

On 3 October 2018, MP Freddy Lim, former Director of the Amnesty International Taiwan, inquired in a hearing session of the Foreign and National Defense Committee in the Legislative Yuan for re-investigation on the Lieyu massacre files in the military archive to render an apology to the victims' families through the Vietnamese Representative Office, but Minister Yen disagreed, claiming that troops followed the "SOP" of the Martial Law to execute the orders, and had been court-martialed. Later, the MND followed up to state that "It has been too difficult to identify the deceased due to the long time, hence (the case) can not be processed further". This served as the sole statement of the government of the Republic of China on the case since martial law was lifted in 1987.

References

1952 births
Living people
Republic of China Army generals
Taiwanese Ministers of National Defense